Bregenz Hafen railway station is a railway station in the town of Bregenz, the capital of the district of Bregenz in the Austrian state of Vorarlberg. It is adjacent to the Bregenz ferry terminal, which offers connections to various points on Lake Constance. It is an intermediate stop on the standard gauge Vorarlberg line of Austrian Federal Railways (ÖBB). The station is served by ÖBB and Vorarlberg S-Bahn trains.

Services 
The regional following services stop at Bregenz Hafen:

References

External links 
 
 

Railway stations in Vorarlberg
Railway stations serving harbours and ports
Vorarlberg S-Bahn stations